Dietzia kunjamensis  is a bacterium from the genus Dietzia which has been isolated from soil from the desert of the Himalayas.

References

Further reading

External links
Type strain of Dietzia kunjamensis at BacDive -  the Bacterial Diversity Metadatabase	

Actinomycetales
Bacteria described in 2006